The Evening Standard Theatre Awards, established in 1955, are the oldest theatrical awards ceremony in the United Kingdom. They are presented annually for outstanding achievements in London Theatre, and are organised by the Evening Standard newspaper. They are the West End's equivalent to Broadway's Drama Desk Awards.

Trophies
The trophies take the form of a modelled statuette, a figure representing Drama, designed by Frank Dobson RA, a former Professor of Sculpture at the Royal College of Art.

Categories
Three of the awards are given in the names of former Evening Standard notables:

Arts editor Sydney Edwards (who conceived the awards, and died suddenly in July 1979) for the Best Director category.
Editor Charles Wintour (who as deputy-editor in 1955, launched the awards after a nod from the proprietor, Lord Beaverbrook') for Most Promising Playwright.
Long-serving theatre critic Milton Shulman (for several years a key member of the judging panel) for the Outstanding Newcomer award.

In 2009, the Special Award was given in the name of Evgeny Lebedev, executive director of the Evening Standard.

In 1980, noting the first use of the Special Award category, Shulman observed that "In 1968 the judges felt that Alan Bennett's work Forty Years On did not fit either the category of a Play or a Musical. But since they liked it so much they gave him the coveted Dobson statuette as a Special Award. In a quarter of a century, only in 1968 had no-one been designated as 'Promising' although it could conceivably be argued that Alan Bennett's Special Award was a reasonable substitute for this category."

The Special Award process came to a climax in 2004 when, in the 50th anniversary year, the category was used to signal peaks of accomplishment by the National Theatre (an institution), Harold Pinter (a playwright) and Dame Judi Dench (a performer).

The Patricia Rothermere Award, presented biennially from 1999 to 2005, was created to honour the memory of Patricia Harmsworth, Viscountess Rothermere, wife of Viscount Rothermere, chairman of the Daily Mail and General Trust, which formerly owned the Evening Standard. The two part award recognised those who had given outstanding support to young actors, while also providing a three-year scholarship award for a drama student.

Commencing in 2009, the Best Actress award was renamed in tribute to Natasha Richardson, who died after a skiing accident in Quebec in March 2009.

Awards ceremonies
The 2007 Awards lunchtime ceremony took place at the Savoy Hotel in London on 27 November 2007. The judges' assessments of the winners are online.

The 2008 winners were announced in a ceremony at the Royal Opera House, Covent Garden, on 24 November 2008. The judges' assessments are online.

The 2009 winners were announced in a ceremony, again at the Royal Opera House, on Monday, 23 November 2009. The judges' assessments are online.

The 2010 winners were announced at a celebratory evening ceremony on Thursday 28 November 2010 in the newly refurbished Savoy Hotel.

The 2011 winners were announced in a ceremony at the Savoy Hotel on 20 November 2011.

The 2012 winners were announced in a ceremony again at the Savoy Hotel on 25 November 2012.

The 2013 winners were announced in a ceremony again at the Savoy Hotel on 17 November 2013.

The 2014 winners were announced in a ceremony at the London Palladium on 30 November 2014.

The 2015 winners were announced in a ceremony at the Old Vic Theatre on 22 November 2015.

The 2016 winners were announced in a ceremony again at the Old Vic Theatre on 13 November 2016.

The 2017 winners were announced in a ceremony at the Theatre Royal Drury Lane on 3 December 2017.

The 2018 winners were announced in a ceremony again at the Theatre Royal Drury Lane on 18 November 2018.

The 2019 winners were announced in a ceremony at the London Coliseum on 24 November 2019.

The 2022 winners were announced in a ceremony at The Ivy on 11 December 2022.

Awards by year
List of existing articles for individual years:

Winners 1955–2019
Best Play

Best DirectorAlso known as The Sydney Edwards Award for Best Director from 1979. Renamed the Milton Shulman Award for Best Director from 2014.Best Actor

Best ActressAlso known as The Natasha Richardson Award for Best Actress from 2009

Best Musical
Renamed the Ned Sherrin Award for Best Musical in 2007

Best Musical Performance

Best Designer

Best Comedy

Most Controversial Play
 1955 – Waiting for Godot by Samuel Beckett (Only award in this category)

Editor's Award (renamed 'for a Shooting Star' in 2010)

Most Promising Playwright
Also known as the Charles Wintour Award for Most Promising Playwright

Outstanding Newcomer
Also known as the Milton Shulman Award for Outstanding Newcomer
Note: Category ceased but is re-styled as the Emerging Talent Award

Emerging Talent

Theatrical Achievement
1998 – Jonathan Kent and Ian McDiarmid of the Almeida Theatre (Only award in this category)

Lady Rothermere Drama Award
Two part award, originally as the Patricia Rothermere Award

 1992 -  Fionuala Clarence, Scholarship award

1993 – Matthew Rhys, scholarship award
1997 – Judi Dench, for outstanding services to the theatre
1997 – Mark Rice-Oxley, scholarship award
1999 – Simon Callow, for outstanding services to the theatre
1999 – Martin Rea, scholarship award
2001 – Prunella Scales, for ...
2001 – Cassandre Joseph, scholarship award
2003 – Richard Attenborough, for exceptional support for young actors
2003 – Elif Yesil, scholarship award
2005 – Penelope Keith, for ...
2005 – Hannah Croft, scholarship award

The Special Award (given as The Lebedev Special Award in 2009)

Theatre Icon Award
 2013 – Maggie Smith

Moscow Art Theatre's Golden Seagull
 2010 – Sir Peter Hall
 2011 – Sir Tom Stoppard
 2012 – Judi Dench

Beyond Theatre award
 2011 – Pet Shop Boys and Javier de Frutos for The Most Incredible Thing
 2012 – Danny Boyle and his teams for the opening ceremony for the London 2012 Olympics
 2013 – BBC Proms 2013
 2014 – Here Lies Love

Award For Comedy
 2013 – David Walliams for A Midsummer Night's Dream

Best Revival of the Year
 2014 – Skylight

See also
Laurence Olivier Awards
Critics' Circle Theatre Awards
WhatsOnStageAwards
The Offies (The Off West End Theatre Awards)
UK Theatre Awards

Sources
Celebration: 25 Years of British Theatre.  W. H. Allen Ltd, 1980.  , for Awards 1955–1978
Theatre Record and its annual Indexes, for Awards 1981 to date.

References

 
London awards
Awards established in 1955
British theatre awards
1955 establishments in the United Kingdom
Theatre in London